Marco Antonio Cavazzoni (c. 1490 – c. 1560) was an Italian organist and composer. He was the father of composer Girolamo Cavazzoni.

All of his extant music is contained in the print Recerchari, motetti, canzoni [...] libro primo, which was published in Venice in 1523. Included are the earliest known ricercars—they are not yet imitative, and are essentially written down improvisations, but there is a considerable amount of thematic development. The rest of the works in the collection are either arrangements of vocal pieces by Cavazzoni or other composers. Their style is firmly rooted in the Renaissance vocal chanson tradition.

Published works
2 Ricercari
2 Mottetti: 
4 Canzoni: 

A single piece for keyboard Recercada de maca in bologna, now kept in the parochial archives of Castell’Arquato (Piacenza) in Emilia-Romagna (ms. Musicale n. 2, cc. 5v-6v).

References
Apel, Willi. 1972. The History of Keyboard Music to 1700. Translated by Hans Tischler. Indiana University Press. . Originally published as Geschichte der Orgel- und Klaviermusik bis 1700 by Bärenreiter-Verlag, Kassel.

 Dizionario Biografico degli Italiani - Volume 23 (1979) Cavazzoni, Marc'Antonio by Oscar Mischiati (Italian).

External links
 AllMusic More detailed biography by Robert Cummings.

YouTube A Recercada by Marcantonio Cavazzoni played by Irene De Ruvo on the historic organ by Andrea Gavinelli (1690), in church Madonna del Popolo in Romagnano Sesia.
YouTube A Recercada by Marcantonio Cavazzoni played by Luca Scandali on a Giovanni Cipri organ (1556), San Martino Maggiore, Bologna; with original score (Castell’Arquato manuscript).
YouTube  by Ernst Stolz, clavichord.
YouTube Madame vous avez mon cuor, by Catalina Vicens, Renaissance harpsichord.

Italian classical organists
Male classical organists
16th-century Italian composers
Italian male composers
1490s births
1560s deaths
Year of birth uncertain
Year of death uncertain